Hunstanton Park Esker is a  geological Site of Special Scientific Interest east of Hunstanton in Norfolk. The esker extends 1.5 km from north
of Ringstead Downs to Hunstanton Hall. It is a Geological Conservation Review site.

This is a  esker, a long winding ridge of stratified sand and gravel dating to the glacial Devensian period, between 115,000 and 11,700 years ago. This is an uncommon landform in central and southern England.

It is private land and there is no public access.

References

Sites of Special Scientific Interest in Norfolk
Geological Conservation Review sites